Cat 'n' Mouse is a studio album by guitarist John Abercrombie with violinist Mark Feldman, bassist Marc Johnson, and drummer Joey Baron. The album was released by ECM in 2002.

Reception
The Allmusic review gave the album three stars, stating, "John Abercombie makes it clear on Cat 'n' Mouse exactly why he continues to be regarded as one of jazz's most creative and progressive guitarist...On the album's numerous contemplative tunes, it's a pleasure to hear Abercombie and Feldman's lines cris-crossing, creating spontaneous tone poems that bear beauty and invention in equal measure".  The Penguin Guide to Jazz gave the album four stars, stating, "John sounds in great form but it's very often the fiddle that cuts through the mix to make the most empathic statements".

Track listing
All compositions by John Abercrombie except as indicated

 "A Nice Idea" – 10:57
 "Convolution" – 5:34
 "String Thing" – 4:02
 "Soundtrack" – 8:06
 "Third Stream Samba" (John Abercrombie, Joey Baron, Mark Feldman, Marc Johnson) – 8:45
 "On the Loose" – 6:00
 "Stop and Go" – 7:04
 "Show of Hands" (Abercrombie, Baron, Feldman, Johnson) – 9:18

Personnel
 John Abercrombie – guitar
 Mark Feldman – violin
 Marc Johnson – double bass
 Joey Baron – drums

References

ECM Records albums
John Abercrombie (guitarist) albums
2002 albums
Albums produced by Manfred Eicher